Braille music is a braille code that allows music to be notated using braille cells so music can be read by visually impaired musicians.  The system was incepted by Louis Braille.

Braille music uses the same six-position braille cell as literary braille.  However braille music assigns its own meanings and has its own syntax and abbreviations. Almost anything that can be written in print music notation can be written in braille music notation.  However, the notation is an independent and well-developed system with its own conventions.

The world's largest collection of the notation is at the Library of Congress in the United States.

Learning Braille music 
Braille music is in general neither easier nor harder to learn than print music. Visually impaired musicians gain the same benefits upon learning to read braille music as sighted musicians who learn to read print music. Visually impaired musicians can begin learning braille music about the time they have reasonable competence reading literary braille.

Teaching Braille music 
Braille music for beginners, like print music for beginners, is quite simple.  Music teachers with no previous knowledge of braille music can easily learn the rudiments of braille music notation and keep a step or two ahead of the student who is learning braille music.  Some common print method books have a version in braille so both books can be used alongside each other.

Transcribing music into Braille 
Many standard works for some genres, for each instrument appear in braille.  In the US, they are available from the National Library Service for the Blind and Print Disabled (NLS) of the Library of Congress (free for qualified people) and elsewhere.  Most countries have a similar national library.

However, many visually impaired musicians need music that has never before been transcribed to braille music.  In the United States, Canada, United Kingdom, and many other countries a network of braille music transcribers transcribe such music.

Another option is to use a braille-output computer-music system. Most such software automatically converts print notation (sheet music) into braille.

Introduction to Braille music symbols and syntax 
Some of the most common braille music symbols and combinations are summarized in the chart below:

Pitch and rhythm 
As the table below shows, each symbol shows the pitch and choice of two rhythmic lengths of a note which will be context-clear. For instance, dots 1,4,5 indicate the basic form of C which is an eighth note (quaver) or the much-rarer 128th note. Every rhythm symbol, as said, doubles up in meaning; 8th notes match 128th notes, quarter notes (crotchets) match 64th notes, half notes match 32nd notes, and whole notes match 16th notes (semiquavers). Beginners first learn the most common rhythmic value (8th, quarter, half, and whole notes). For advanced users no rhythmic ambiguity arises as the context, including time signature and bar lines, makes the intended rhythmic value clear. For instance, in a measure of 4/4 time that includes only the symbol with dots 1,3,4 (whole or 16th rest), those facts clarify the symbol is a whole rest.

Octave marks 
An octave mark is included before the first note to specify its octave and when it changes unexpectedly.  For instance, the 4th Octave is the octave starting with middle C and going up to the B above middle C.  A melody clearly proceeding upward from the first octave can, if moving by step, proceed to the second, third, and fourth octaves without requiring additional octave signs. The rule is that, save for an octave mark specifying otherwise, notes move by a unison/no change, 2nd, or 3rd rather than a 6th, 7th, or octave. For instance, the following moves upward continuously, ending in octave 5:

Octave 2 C C D E F G A B C D E F G A B C D E F G A B B C C

The rule for 4ths and 5ths is more conservative.  Save for an octave sign specifying otherwise, any melodic leap of a 4th or 5th stays in the same octave as the previous note.  For instance, this always stays within Octave 2:

Octave 2 C G D A E B F C G D A E

Because of the use of octave marks, clef symbols are not required in braille music.  On occasion, clef symbols (bass clef, treble clef, or other) will be given so the visually impaired musician will be aware of every detail of the print score.

Musical markings 
Musical indications like diminuendo, crescendo, or ritardando are inserted inline with the note and rhythm notation and, to differentiate them from note, octave, and other musical signs, always preceded by the "word sign" (dots 3,4,5). See the table below for some examples:

Slurs may be indicated by a slur sign between two notes or bracket slur surrounding a group of notes to be slurred.

Musical signs such as staccato or tenuto are generally placed before the note or chord they affect. The musical signs in the table below are shown modifying a quarter note C (dots 1,4,5,6):

"Music hyphen" states that a measure will be continued on the next line (this happens somewhat more often in braille music than in print music).

A "word apostrophe" indicates that the word will be continued on the following line.

Fingering marks are shown in the table below:

Repetition symbols 
Braille music tends to be rather bulky.  Because of this, a system of repetition symbols—much more extensive than that in print music—exists to reduce page turns, size of scores, and expense of printing.

The repetition symbol (dots 2,3,5,6) is used like the printed intra-bar symbol  to indicate that a beat, half measure, or full measure is to be repeated.

In addition, braille music often includes instructions such as "repeat measure 2 here" or "repeat measures 5–7 here".  Such are in addition to the commonly used repeat marks and first and second endings.

Contrapuntal lines and chords within a staff 
Unlike print music notation, braille music is a linear format.  Therefore, certain conventions must be used to indicate contrapuntal lines and chords (where more than one note is played simultaneously within a staff).

In-accords 
Independent contrapuntal lines within a staff are indicated via whole- or part-measure in-accords.  The first of the contrapuntal lines is given, then the second, enclosed by the in-accord symbols.  The in-accord symbols indicate that the two lines are to be played simultaneously.

Interval notation 
Homophonic chordal sections are written using interval notation.  For instance, the notation "quarter-note-C, 3rd, 5th" would indicate playing a C along with the notes a 3rd and 5th higher than C, making a chord C-E-G a quarter note in length. Reading the interval notation is somewhat complicated by the fact that some staves use bottom-up notation (the bottom note of each chord is specified and intervals are read upwards from the given note) and some use top-down notation (the top note of each chord is specified and intervals are read downwards from the given note). The modern convention is to specify the main note (either the bass line or melody line) and let the intervals go up or down from there as appropriate.  For instance, in most piano music the left hand specifies the bottom note and intervals go bottom-up while the right hand specifies the top note and intervals go top-down. Many older scores have all staves reading bottom-up or all reading top-down. Most scores have a note indicating the direction of the interval notation.  However, in some older scores the direction must be established from the context. By convention, in-accords are given in the same direction as the interval notation. Thus, examining the in-accords is a key to unlock which reading applies.

Dealing with different staves 
Printed music is often written on simultaneous staves.  For instance, piano music is typically written on two which compose the grand staff: one for treble clef (which soprano singers use) and one for bass clef. Standard choral work uses this mainly where they do not cross or four where they do, as for string quartet music (the most common added clefs are alto and/or tenor). The notes in different staves that play simultaneously are aligned vertically. Because of the linear nature of braille music and the fact that the blind musician can typically read only one staff at a time, multiple staves are handled in several ways depending on the complexity of the music and other considerations. Bar over bar format is most similar to print music with right-hand notation on the top line and left-hand notation on the bottom line. Some degree of vertical alignment between the right and left hands is maintained. Other ways of dealing with multiple-staff music are: line over line format, section by section format; paragraph style; and bar by bar format.  As a rule these take up less space on the page but require more of the musician in working out how to fit the staves together. For instance, in a piano score notated in section by section format, the right-hand part may be written out for the first 8 measures, followed by the left-hand part.  No attempt is made to align the parts. The same procedure is followed for measures 9–16, and so on, section by section, throughout the score. The blind musician learns and memorizes one section right hand alone, then left hand alone, then works out the hands together by memory and referencing various spots in the braille score to work out how the sections fit together. A note from the transcriber often clarifies the format used.  However, with many older and more complex scores the format must be determined by examination of the music and context.

Variations in Braille music 
Over the years and in the many different countries, a variety of minor differences in braille music practice have arisen.  Some have preferred a different standard for interval or staff notation or used different codes for various less common musical notations. An international effort to standardize the braille music code culminated in updates summarized in the Music Braille Code 1997 and detailed in New International Manual of Braille Music Notation (1997)  However, users should be aware that they will encounter divergences when ordering scores from printing houses and libraries because these are often older and from various countries.

See also
Blind musicians

Notes

References 

 
   (print).  (braille).

External links 
 NLB Braille Music Library
 Braille Music (RNIB)
 The Braille Music Code 1997—a complete description of the Braille Music Code (HTML).
 Music Braille Code, 2015—a complete description of the Braille Music Code. Braille Authority of North America. (PDF and BRF).
 Music Braille
 Contrapunctus (2006-2009), was a project of the European Union to design and to develop a demonstration service allowing faster and easier access and use of Braille music scores filed in libraries and transcription centres, by focusing on developing international standards for electronic representations of Braille music.
 Music4VIP (Music for visually impaired people) is a European project, started on 1 November 2012.
 Music21 is a Python-based toolkit for computer-aided musicology. Includes methods to export braille music code.
 FreeDots is a music notation converter primarily for blind users. It converts MusicXML into Braille Music.
 BMC -- Braille Music Compiler — Software that converts Braille Music into MusicXML and Lilypond, by Mario Lang.
Braille Music Notator - Online editor of braille music, written in JavaScript by Toby W. Rush, who also wrote Braille Music Viewer.

Musical notation
Braille symbols